Frank Paul Sylos (1900–1976) was an American art director. He worked on around a hundred and ninety films during his career, as well as television shows. He is sometimes credited as Frank P. Sylos.

Selected filmography
 What Becomes of the Children? (1936)
 The Fabulous Suzanne (1946)
 Albuquerque (1948)
 The Return of Jesse James (1950)
 Boy, Did I Get a Wrong Number! (1966)

References

Bibliography
 Fetrow, Alan G. Feature Films, 1950-1959: A United States Filmography. McFarland, 1999.

External links

1900 births
1976 deaths
American art directors